Jonsvatnet is a lake in Trøndelag county, Norway. Most of the lake is in the eastern part of the municipality of Trondheim, with a very small part of the shoreline belonging to Malvik municipality. The lake is the main source for drinking water for the city of Trondheim.

Media gallery

See also
List of lakes in Norway

References

Geography of Trondheim
Malvik
Lakes of Trøndelag